Andrew Gerard Tynan (1907–1960) was a Catholic prelate and the Bishop of Rockhampton in Queensland, Australia, from 31 March 1946 until his death on 3 June 1960. He was the first Queenslander to be appointed as a bishop.

He was born in Brisbane on 25 November 1907, the son of Andrew Tynan and his wife Angela (nee Walsh). He died suddenly in London on 3 June 1960 while he was travelling to Rome for an ad limina visit. His body was returned to Rockhampton and he was buried on Tuesday 14 June 1960 in the South Rockhampton Cemetery in Allenstown.

References 

1907 births
1960 deaths
Roman Catholic bishops of Rockhampton